A lighterman is a worker who operates a lighter, a type of flat-bottomed barge, which may be powered or unpowered. In the latter case, today it is usually moved by a powered tug. The term is particularly associated with the highly skilled men who operated the unpowered lighters moved by oar and water currents in the Port of London.

Lightermen in the Port of London

History
Lightermen were one of the most characteristic groups of workers in London's docks during the heyday of the Port of London, but their trade was eventually rendered largely obsolete by changes in shipping technology. They were closely associated with the watermen, who carried passengers, and in 1700 joined the Company of Watermen to form the Company of Watermen and Lightermen. This is not, strictly speaking, a livery company but a "City Company Without Grant of Livery", formed in 1700 by Act of Parliament. The Guild continues to license watermen and lightermen working on the River Thames. Watermans' Hall is located at 16 St Mary At Hill, in Billingsgate. It dates to 1780 and is the only surviving Georgian guild hall.

The construction of the docks was bitterly opposed by the lightermen and other vested interests, but went ahead anyway. However, they did win a major concession: that became known as the "free-water clause", first introduced into the West India Dock Act of 1799 and subsequently written into the Acts governing all of the other docks. This stated that there was to be no charge for "lighters or craft entering into the docks ... to convey, deliver, discharge or receive ballast or goods to or from on board any ship ... or vessel." This was intended to give lighters and barges the same freedom in docks that they enjoyed on the open river. In practice, however, this proved highly damaging to the dock owners. It allowed ships to be loaded and unloaded overside, using barges and lighters to transfer their goods to and from riverside wharves rather than dock quays, thus bypassing quay dues and dock warehouses. This significantly reduced the docks' income and harmed their finances, while boosting the profits of their riverside competitors. Not surprisingly, the dock owners lobbied vigorously—but unsuccessfully—for the abolition of this damaging privilege.

Operation

The lightermen were a vital component of the Port of London before the enclosed docks were built during the 19th and 20th centuries. Ships anchored in the middle of the Thames or near bridge arches transferred their goods aboard or in respect of a few exports from lighters. Lightermen rode the river's currents — westward, when the tide was coming in, eastward on the ebb tide — to transfer the goods to quay-sides. They also transferred goods up and down the river from quays to riverside factories and vice versa. This was an extremely skilled job, requiring an intimate knowledge of the river's currents and tides. It also demanded a lot of muscle power, as the lighters were unpowered; they relied on the current for motive force and on long oars, or "paddles", for steering.

The lightermen's trade was eventually swept away by the docks mentioned, as well as economic and technological changes, particularly the introduction of containers, which led to the closure of London's major central docks in the 1960s.

Few written accounts of the process of becoming an apprentice now exist, though the best-known is Men of the Tideway by Dick Fagan and Eric Burgess. (Fagan worked as a lighterman for more than forty years). In the book, Fagan mentions the exploitative nature of lighterage and expresses his disdain for what he called a "free-for-all capitalist system".

The term lighterman is still used for the workers who operate motorised lighters to access a vessel which is too large or due to conditions unable to moor at a dock and the phrase to alight goods is used in the goods trade widely compared to the phrase 'alighting of passengers' which has become archaic across most of the English-speaking world except in formal contexts and on some railways, having been generally replaced with the terms 'exit', 'leave', or 'depart'.

Lightermen in Hull
The Humber Estuary causes similar problems to the Thames plus vast shifting sandbanks. For centuries the Port of Hull took much of its traffic in transfer of cargoes between vessels as Hull was cut off from safe land routes for much of the year. Lightermen were experts in these transfers and also in guiding vessels to safe moorings away from the sandbanks.  By the 19th century, enclosed docks were being built but only with the arrival of steam barges late in the century did the Lightermen's expertise become redundant. A sub-category consisted of ballast lightermen, specialising in transferring rubble, bricks, and cobbles to and from the lower holds of vessels to keep them upright even in severe storms.

See also 

Company of Watermen and Lightermen
The Thames Barge Driving Race
Containerization
Lightering

Notes

External links
 Watermen's Hall Official Site
 Men of the Tideway by Fagan and Burgess (Chapters 1 & 2 available only)
 Waterman's Hall
 Company of Watermen and Lightermen
 http://www.portcities.org.uk/london/server/show/conMediaFile.1397/A-London-lighterman-c-1910.html
 Thames Lighterman photos
 Lighterman apprentice certificates and licences
 Website dedicated to history of Lightermen

Bibliography
Stephen Dobbs, The Singapore River, Part 1 - 3 Lightermen: Migration and destiny. This book devotes a chapter to Indian lightermen in the Singapore River.

Marine occupations
Economy of London
Transport on the River Thames
Port of London